Dumm is a surname. Notable people with the surname include:

Andrew Dumm (born 1985), American long-distance runner
Edwina Dumm (1893–1990), American writer and cartoonist
Gary Dumm (born 1947), American comics artist
Lois Privor-Dumm, American researcher